Hattaya Bamrungsuk (born 12 August 1993) is a Thai indoor volleyball player. She is a current member of the Thailand women's national volleyball team.

Career
She participated at the 2010 World Grand Prix, 2014 World Championship, 2017 World Grand Prix, and 2018 Nations League.

Club
  Nakhon Ratchasima (2010–2018)
  Diamond Food VC (2020–2021)
  Toyota Auto Body Queenseis (2021–2022)

Awards

Individuals
 2010–11 Thailand League – "Best Blocker"
 2012–13 Thailand League – "Best Blocker"
 2013–14 Thailand League – "Most Valuable Player"
 2015 U23 Asian Championship – "Best Middle Blocker"
 2016 Montreux Volley Masters – "Best Middle Blocker"
 2017 Asian Championship – "Best Middle Blocker"

Club
 2013–14 Thailand League –  Champion, with Nakhon Ratchasima
 2017–18 Thailand League –  Runner-up, with Nakhon Ratchasima

National team

Senior team
 2016 Montreux Masters -  Silver Medal

References

External links
Profile at FIVB

1993 births
Living people
Hattaya Bamrungsuk
Hattaya Bamrungsuk
Thai expatriate sportspeople in Japan
Expatriate volleyball players in Japan
Hattaya Bamrungsuk
Hattaya Bamrungsuk
Southeast Asian Games medalists in volleyball
Competitors at the 2015 Southeast Asian Games
Competitors at the 2017 Southeast Asian Games
Asian Games medalists in volleyball
Volleyball players at the 2018 Asian Games
Hattaya Bamrungsuk
Medalists at the 2018 Asian Games
Hattaya Bamrungsuk
Competitors at the 2021 Southeast Asian Games
Middle blockers
Hattaya Bamrungsuk